The Halberstadt C.VII was a German single-engined reconnaissance biplane of World War I, built by Halberstädter Flugzeugwerke. It was derived from the Halberstadt C.V, with a more powerful supercharged  Maybach Mb.IV engine.

Specifications

See also

References

External links

Military aircraft of World War I
1910s German military reconnaissance aircraft
C.VII
Single-engined tractor aircraft
Biplanes
Aircraft first flown in 1918